Juan Carlos Chirinos García (Valera, May 3, 1967) is a Venezuelan writer and creative writing teacher. He is a novelist, story writer and biographer.

Books
 Renacen las sombras (2021), novel.
 La sonrisa de los hipopótamos (2020), short-stories.
 Los cielos de curumo (2019), novel.
Venezuela. Biografía de un suicidio (2017), essay.
La manzana de Nietzsche (2015), short-stories.
Gemelas (2013), novel.
Nochebosque (2011), novel.
El niño malo cuenta hasta cien y se retira (2004), novel.
Los sordos trilingües (2011), short-stories.
Homero haciendo zapping (2003), short-stories.
Leerse los gatos (1997), short-stories.
Miranda, el nómada sentimental (2006), biography.
La reina de los cuatro nombres. Olimpia, madre de Alejandro Magno (2005), biography.
Alberto Einstein, cartas probables para Hann (2004), biography,
Alejandro Magno, el vivo anhelo de conocer (2004), biography.

Anthologies
 Escribir afuera - «España se ríe de Casandra» (Madrid, Kalathos Ediciones, 2021. ISBN 9788412331622).
El Rapto de Europa - «La gente inteligente, como Sócrates, sabe cada vez menos», (Madrid, Calamar Ediciones, 2018. No. 37-38, ISSN 1695-5161).
Relatos de la Orilla Negra V. 2018: Clave Binacional Italia Venezuela - «Sobre los tiranos», (Caracas, Ediciones La Orilla Negra, 2018. ).
Revista Quimera, Nº 401 (Abril de 2017). - «Cuentonario», (Dossier de literatura venezolana). ISSN 0211-3325.
Relatos de la orilla negra V - «Decir casi lo mismo», (Caracas, La Orilla Negra/Lector Cómplice, 2017. ).
Encuentros y palabras - «Relato de dragón», «Laura», «Para comenzar primero por lo primario», (Salamanca, Edifsa, 2017. ).
Nuestros más cercanos parientes - «Leerse los gatos», (Madrid, Kalathos, 2016. ).
 Cuentos memorables venezolanos - «Agnus rey», (Caracas, Planeta, 2015. ).
 El rastro de Lovecraft - «Un espantapájaros lisiado», (Caracas, Alfaguara/Santillana, 2015. ).
 Revista Suelta - «La sonrisa de Peter Pan», Guatemala, 2013.
 El cuento venezolano - «La mujer de las montañas» (Caracas, EBUCV, 2013)
 Los oficios del libro - «La manzana de Nietzsche», (Madrid, Libros de la Ballena/UAM, 2011 )
 Río Grande Review #37 - «El alfabeto del profesor Chomsky», (El Paso, RGR, 2011)
 La vasta brevedad - «Ichbiliah», (Caracas, Alfaguara, 2010 )
 Revista Eñe, 17 (Spring 2009). - Catrusia 
 Las distintas caras de la urbe: Una mirada a la cuentística venezolana de los años 90 in: Confluencia, Revista Hispánica de Cultura y Literatura, University of Northern Colorado (Spring, 2008 - Issue 23.2) - Leerse los gatos
 Las voces secretas - «Un ataque de lentitud», (Caracas, Alfaguara, 2007 )
 21 del XXI - «Ichbiliah», (Caracas, Ediciones B, 2007 )
 Inmenso estrecho - «La mirada de Rousseau», (Madrid, Kailas, 2006 )
 Cuentos venezolanos - «Pelópidas», (La Habana, Letras cubanas, 2005 )
 Pequeñas resistencias, 3 - «Pelópidas», (Madrid, Páginas de Espuma, 2004 )
 Nueva cuentística venezolana: breve inmersión in: Hispamérica, #97, University of Maryland, 2004. - Homero haciendo zapping

Translations into other languages
 English
 Ride of the Valkyries (Cabalgata de Walkirias). Jonathan Blitzer, translator. Words Without Borders, February 2011.
 Arabic
 Agnus rey & Homero haciendo zapping. Nedjma Bernaoui, translator. Encuentros literarios, Argel, Instituto Cervantes, 2009 NIPO 503090194
 French
 Pélopidas. Gersende Camenen, translator. Les bonnes nouvelles de l’Amérique latine. Anthologie de la nouvelle latino-américaine contemporaine, Gallimard, «Du monde entier», 2010 
 Pélopidas. Hélène Rioux, translator. Anthologie de récits vénézuéliens contemporains, Montreal, XYZ, 2009 
 Italian
 Cabalgata de Walkirias. Barbara Stizzoli and Antonio Nazzaro, translators. Il tuo aroma nella mia pelle, Salerno, Edizioni Arcoiris, 2019.

As editor 
 José Balza: Percusión (Madrid, Ediciones Cátedra, 2022) ISBN 978-84-376-4495-0. Juan Carlos Chirinos, editor.
 Jorge Edwards: Persona non grata (Caracas, El Estilete, 2017) ISBN 980-778-621-5. (El rey siempre está desnudo, foreword).
 Thomas Carlyle: El doctor Francia (Sevilla, Renacimiento, 2017) ISBN 841-698-128-0. (El biógrafo honorable, foreword).
 Pablo Acevedo: Estrella varada (Madrid, Polibea, 2012) ISBN 978-84-86701-45-1. (Júpiter, melancólico, busca la palabra, foreword).
 José Gregorio Hernández: Sobre arte y estética (Caracas, La Liebre Libre, 1995) ISBN 980-327-270-5. (José Gregorio Hernández y la filosofía nacional, foreword).

Awards
2022. En.-Feb. Resident writer. Asociación Cultural La Noria Aix-en-Provence (France).
2020. Finalist in the XVII Real Academia Española Prize, Madrid.
2018. Finalist in the Premio de la Crítica de Venezuela.
International Juan Rulfo Short Story Contest, Radio France Internationale, 2009. Finalist.
2005. The Secretaría de Educación Pública (SEP) of México chose Albert Einstein, cartas probables para Hann for the school reading program.
2002. First prize, José Antonio Ramos Sucre Literary Biennal, Cumaná, Venezuela.
2000. The short film, 3caracoles3, was chosen for the XIV Semana de Cine de Medina del Campo, Valladolid (Spain).
1997-1998. Fundación Gran Mariscal de Ayacucho Fellowship for doctoral studies in Salamanca University.
1994. First mention, Short Story Prize, Spain Embassy, Caracas, Venezuela.

About the author
Katie Brown (University of Exeter, UK): Writing and the Revolution. Venezuelan Metafiction 2004-2012, Liverpool: Liverpool University Press. 2019. 
Wilfrido H. Corral: Venezuela: Biografía de un suicidio by Juan Carlos Chirinos, in World Literature Today, Volume 92 No. 5, September 2018.
Lyda Aponte de Zacklin (City College of New York, EE.UU.): Una parodia del mal, in Revista Cronopio, #61, July 2013.
Elda Stanco (Roanoke College, EE.UU.): Juan Carlos Chirinos, in The Contemporary Spanish-American Novel. Bolaño and After (Will H. Corral, Juan E. De Castro, Nicholas Birns, editors). Bloomsbury, 2013.
Jonathan Blitzer: Si estás en Madrid: A Bilingual Anthology, Musa a las 9/Words Without Borders, 2012.
Roberto Echeto: Dos novelas de horror y sangre, in Roberto Echeto presenta..., 01/01/2012.
Carmen Ruiz Barrionuevo (Universidad de Salamanca, España): Juan Carlos Chirinos en la tradición literaria del mal, in: Voces y escrituras de Venezuela, Caracas, Cátedra José Antonio Ramos Sucre, 2011.
Katie Brown: Chirinos, Dalí and Ants, en Katie Brown on Culture, 14/12/2011.
Jorge Eduardo Benavides: El niño malo en Madrid, El Boomerang, 2010.
Roberto Echeto: Un libro en verdad fascinante, in Roberto Echeto presenta..., 11/09/2008.
José Rafael Simón Pérez: El niño malo cuenta hasta cien y se retira, in Letras, v. 49, n. 75, Caracas,  2007.

References

External links
 Official Website
 La Mancha
 Juan Carlos Chirinos in Conocer al autor
 Jonathan Blitzer on Ride of the Valkyries
 El niño malo cuenta hasta cien y se retira in Letras (v. 49, #75), Caracas
 Jorge Eduardo Benavides on El niño malo cuenta hasta cien y se retira, El Boomeran(g), Madrid
 Miranda, el nómada sentimental in Literanova
 Un ataque de lentitud included in Las voces secretas Hispamérica, #97
 Interviews
 Interview with Jonathan Blitzer, Words Without Borders
 Interview with Elba Escobar, Onda, la superestación
 Interview with Álbinson Linares, El Nacional, Caracas
 El Nacional, Caracas: Escribir es un oficio muy burgués
 El Mundo, Caracas
 Relectura

Venezuelan male writers
Venezuelan expatriates in Spain
1967 births
Living people
Venezuelan novelists
Venezuelan biographers
Venezuelan male short story writers
Venezuelan short story writers
Male novelists
Male biographers
20th-century biographers
21st-century novelists
People from Valera
20th-century short story writers
21st-century short story writers
20th-century male writers
21st-century male writers